Francisco Xavier Ricardo Vilá y Mateu, O.F.M.Cap. (9 May 1851 – 1 January 1913) was a Spanish prelate of the Roman Catholic Church and a member of the Order of Friars Minor Capuchin. He arrived as Guam's first bishop in 1911, and serving as apostolic vicar for less than a year, dying on 1 January 1913.

Biography 

Ricardo Vilá y Mateu was born on 9 May 1851 in the small town of Arenys de Mar, Province of Barcelona in Catalonia, Spain. In his late teens, he decided to become a Capuchin Franciscan friar, but the turbulent political situation caused him to pursue his vocation elsewhere. He moved to Guatemala in 1869 and joined the order there, taking the name of Francisco Javier, in honor of St. Francis Xavier, the famous Spanish missionary. He studied theology in Toulouse, France, and was ordained a priest on 24 August 1875 in Ecuador.

Vilá's first leadership position was as Novice Master in Spain. He later served as Provincial Definitor and Provincial Minister (superior) of the Capuchin Aragon Province from 1889–1895, and the Catalonia Province from 1900–1906.

On 25 August 1911, Pope Pius X appointed Vilá the first Apostolic Vicar of the Apostolic Vicariate of Agaña in Guam. He was also appointed to the position of Titular Bishop of Adraa. His consecration to the episcopacy took place on 1 October 1911, with Bishop Juan José Laguarda y Fenollera, Bishop of Barcelona, as the Principal Consecrator. Principal Co-Consecrators were Bishop Francisco de Pol y Baralt, Bishop of Gerona, and Bishop Luis José Amigó y Ferrer, O.F.M.Cap., Titular Bishop of Thagaste.

Prior to Vilá's appointment, the highest church official in Guam had been one of the priests running the island's mission, usually a Jesuit, Augustinian Recollect, or diocesan priest from the Archdiocese of Cebu in the Philippines. In the years directly preceding his episcopate, German Capuchins had been tasked to take over the mission, and were set to arrive in 1911. However, when social and political opposition prevented them from doing so, the Holy See assigned Spanish Capuchins instead. It was also decided that the growth of Catholicism in Guam warranted formal leadership and hence Vilá's appointment as the first Vicar General.

Vilá's term was cut short by his sudden death on 1 January 1913 in Hagåtña, the village that held the cathedral. He was buried the next day, making him the first Catholic bishop interred on Guam.

References 

1851 births
1913 deaths
Guamanian Roman Catholic bishops
Spanish Roman Catholic bishops
Capuchin bishops
Roman Catholic bishops of Agaña